Shi Chong (249–300), courtesy name Jilun (季倫), was a Chinese politician of the Western Jin Dynasty. He was a son of situ Shi Bao (石苞). He was known for his luxurious lifestyle.

Biography 
Shi Chong was the sixth son of situ Shi Bao (石苞). At a young age, he showed great intelligence and courage. As a result, his father decided to leave no property for him, as he was confident that Shi Chong could make a fortune on his own. Shi Chong first served as magistrate of Xiuwu County and Governor of Chengyang Commandery (a commandery in Jiaodong Peninsula, centered in Ju County). He became Marquis of Anyang Xiang due to his participance in Conquest of Wu by Jin. Later, his rose to  Shizhong (侍中, an attendant and consultant in the imperial court) position.

In the first year of Yuankang (291), Yang Jun became regent. As a dissident, Shi Chong left the capital and became Governor of Jingzhou. Later, he was appointed as Dasinong (大司农, in charge of finance). However, the appointment was cancelled because he left his post before the official announcement. Shortly after, he was appointed as Zhenglu General, guarding the Xuzhou region. Soon, he was removed after an incident where he became drunk and fought with Gao Dan, Governor of Xuzhou.

After Queen Regent Jia Nanfeng gained power, he became a friend of Jia's nephew, Jia Mi, by flattering the latter. It was recorded that whenever Guo Huai, Jia Nanfeng's mother passed by, Shi would stop and prostrate himself before her.

In the first year of Yongkang (300), the Prince of Zhao, Sima Lun, exterminated the Jia family. Shi Chong was removed from his post as an ally of the family. Sun Xiu, a favorite of Sima Lun, hated Shi Chong over the beauty of Shi's concubine, Lüzhu (绿珠), and framed Shi that he had conspired with Prince of Huainan, Sima Yun, who rebelled against Sima Lun. Shi Chong was subsequently executed along with his family.

Notable anecdotes 
Shi Chong was best known for his extravagant lifestyle. On the position as Governor of Jingzhou, Shi accumulated huge wealth by engaging in highway robbery, often murdering merchants passing by for their properties. Shi Chong and Wang Kai (王恺), a consort kin, loathed each other. After learning that Wang Kai's family used sugar water to clean their dishes and pots, Shi ordered his servants to burn candles instead of firewood. On the road to his manor, Wang decorated the roadside barriers with purple silk for 40 li''' (ca. 15 km). On learning this, Shi covered 50 li with more expensive multicolored silk. Emperor Wu of Jin once sent Wang Kai a coral tree two chi (ca. 50 cm) in height as a gift. Shi Chong visited him, smashed it with an iron ruyi, and offered him several corals 3-4 chi'' in height in return.

References 

249 births
300 deaths
3rd-century executions
Executed Jin dynasty (266–420) people
Jin dynasty (266–420) politicians
People executed by the Jin dynasty (266–420)